Gosaingram railway station is a railway station on Nalhati–Azimganj branch line under the Howrah railway division of Eastern Railway zone. It is situated at Matiapara, Gosaingram in Murshidabad district in the Indian state of West Bengal.

History
Nalhati–Azimganj branch line connecting Nalhati Junction to Azimganj Junction railway station was opened on 21 December 1863 as Nalhati–Azimganj State railway. This was purchased by the Government of India in 1872. It became a part of the East Indian Railway Company in 1892.

References

Railway stations in Murshidabad district
Howrah railway division
Railway stations opened in 1863